Ždaňa is a village and municipality in Košice-okolie District in the Kosice Region of eastern Slovakia. The village has a population of around 1,400.

History
In historical records the village was first mentioned in 1222.

Geography
The village lies at an altitude of 185 metres and covers an area of 5.565 km².
It has a population of about 1310 people.

Ethnicity
The population is almost entirely Slovak in ethnicity.

Culture
The village has a public library and a number of general and food stores, and an insurance company branch.

Sport
The village has a football pitch and a gymnasium.

Transport
The nearest railway station is at Čaňa.

References

External links
http://www.statistics.sk/mosmis/eng/run.html

Villages and municipalities in Košice-okolie District